Lepidosirenidae is a family of lungfish containing the genera Lepidosiren (the South American lungfish) and Protopterus (the African lungfish). Both genera were formerly thought to represent the distinct families Lepidosirenidae and Protopteridae within the order Lepidosireniformes, but a 2017 study analyzing all post-Devonian lungfish taxa found them to be better classified as different genera in a single family.

Taxonomy 
Their closest living relatives are of the family Neoceratodontidae, or the Australian lungfish, with both families being members of the suborder Ceratodontoidei. However, their closest relatives in general are of the extinct Gnathorhizidae, which forms a sister group to Lepidosirenidae. The clade containing both families forms a sister group to the extinct family Ptychoceratodontidae. The earliest fossils of the family come from the Late Cretaceous (Campanian-Maastrichtian) of Sudan, but phylogenetic evidence indicates the two genera split at the very beginning of the Early Cretaceous, around 145 MYA, and the family itself originated during the end-Carboniferous period.

Biology 
All lungfish of the order can and often do estivate (except the spotted African lungfish, which can but rarely does so). All members of the order are obligatory air-breathers; only the Australian lungfish has functioning gills when adult; members of the Lepidosirenidae have gills only when they are larvae. The lungfish also all have generally small scales and two lungs as opposed to the Australian lungfish's single lung.

References 

Taxa named by Charles Lucien Bonaparte
Lungfish
Fish families
Extant Cenomanian first appearances